Elisàr August Emanuel von Kupffer (20 February 1872 – 31 October 1942) was a Baltic German artist, anthologist, poet, historian, translator, and playwright. He used the pseudonym "Elisarion" for most of his writings.

Early life
He was born on 20 February 1872, in Sophiental, near Reval (now Tallinn), Estonia, the son of Adolf von Kupffer (1833–1896), a doctor from an aristocratic German family.

From an early age he was in delicate health, having suffered through meningitis, rheumatoid arthritis, scarlet fever and measles. However he was also a good student and at the age of nine he wrote his first play, Don Irsino.

In 1883 he enrolled in school in Reval, the same year the family moved from Sophiental to Jootme Manor. At the age of nineteen, he entered the German Annenschule in St. Petersburg. It was near there, in Levashovo, that he met the person who would become his best friend, the historian and philosopher Eduard von Mayer (1873–1960), and his first partner, Agnes von Hoyningen-Huene (1872–1961). In 1894 he moved to Germany.

Career

In 1895 he published Leben und Liebe (Life and Love), a book of poetry. In autumn of that year he moved to Berlin to study at the Berlin Art Academy and moved in with Von Mayer. The following year, he left Agnes and wrote the dramas Der Herr der Welt (Master of the World), and Irrlichter (Wisps) as well as three one-act plays. In 1897 he published the anthology Ehrlos (Infamous, or Dishonorable).

Von Mayer graduated in 1897 and they travelled throughout Italy, Sicily, Southern France and Geneva before returning to Berlin. They spent the summer in Thuringia and Heiligendamm and went back to Italy in 1899. Early next year, Adolf Brand published Von Kupffer's influential anthology of homoerotic literature, Lieblingminne und Freundesliebe in der Weltliteratur (roughly, "Love of Favourites and Love Between Friends in World Literature". Lieblingminne is a neologism created by Von Kupffer). The anthology was researched and created, in part, as a protest against the imprisonment of Oscar Wilde in England. It was reprinted in 1995.

In 1908 he published a book on Il Sodoma, the Renaissance artist. In 1911, he and Von Mayer founded the publishing house Klaristische Verlag Akropolis in Munich and Von Kupffer published three major works: a play, Aino und Tio, Hymnen der heiligen Burg (Hymns of the Holy Castle) and Ein neuer Flug und eine heilige Burg (A New Flight and a Holy Castle). His work was also published and reviewed in the gay magazine Akademos, published by Jacques d'Adelswärd-Fersen. That same year, he and Von Meyer announced the creation of a "new religion", Klarismus (Clarity), and established a community in Weimar. The following year he published a book on Klarismus called Der unbekannte Gott (The Unknown God). In 1913, the Brogi Gallery in Florence hosted his first art exhibition. Later that year, a Klarist community was established in Zürich.

Later life and death
In 1915, with World War I in progress and growing animosity towards Germans, they left Italy and moved to Ticino, where Von Kupffer established himself as a painter and muralist in Locarno, Switzerland. They were granted Swiss citizenship in 1922. From 1925 to 1929 they transformed their villa in Minusio, near Lake Maggiore, into an opulent collection of art, the "Sanctuarium Artis Elisarion". He was also a photographer, making photographic studies of boys for use in the creation of his paintings, but most of his works featured a  youthful version of himself. The Klarist "Elisarion Community" was founded at Minusio in 1926. During the 1930s, the number of visitors increased, then sharply decreased; stopping altogether just before the onset of World War II.

As his health declined, he became reclusive and died on 31 October 1942. Since 1981 the "Sanctuarium Artis Elisarion" has been a Museum dedicated to Von Kupffer's work. The villa was willed to the municipality of Minusio, and his ashes are interred inside, together with Von Meyer's. The Elisarion Community was satirically referenced as the "Polysadrion" (roughly; Place of Many Idiots), in the 1931 novel Schloss Gripsholm by Kurt Tucholsky.

Works 
 "Leben und Lieben. Gedichte" (1895).
 Irrlichter (1900, three theatreworks: Andrei, Erich and Narkissos).
 "Klima und Dichtung. Ein Beitrag zur Psychophysik" (1907).
 "Giovan Antonio — il Sodoma. Eine Seelen- und Kunststudie von Elisàr von Kupffer" (1908) in: Jahrbuch für sexuelle Zwischenstufen, edition IX.
 Aino und Tio (1907).
 "Was soll uns der Klarismus? — Nationale Kraft" (1912).
 "Die Gotteslästerungen der Bibel und der Antike" (1912).
 "Hymnen der Heiligen Burg" (1913).
 "3000 Jahre Bolschewismus" (1919).
 "Heldische Sicht und Froher Glaube" (1942).
 "Aus einem wahrhaften Leben" (1943).

References

Further reading
 Fabio Ricci: Ritter, Tod und Eros: Die Kunst Elisàr von Kupffers (1872–1942) (2007) basic scientific work about E. von Kupffer, 80 reproductions
 Cecile Beurdeley (Trans.: M. Taylor). L'Amour bleu (1978) (Reproduces many examples of Kupffer's murals at Locarno). 
 Graziano Mandozzi. Elisarion : un santuario per il Clarismo (1996)

External links 

Centro Culturale Elisarion

1872 births
1942 deaths
People from Tallinn
People from the Governorate of Estonia
Baltic-German people
20th-century German male writers
German gay writers
German gay artists